The geology of the United Kingdom is such that there are many headlands along its coast. This incomplete list includes both major and minor headlands running clockwise around the coast from Berwick-upon-Tweed. The more significant ones have been tagged with an *. Headlands around the British coast are most commonly named as  'point', 'ness' or 'head' though 'trwyn' (nose), 'penrhyn' (peninsula) and 'pen' (head) are common in Wales as is 'rubha' in western Scotland.

Below is a list of headlands of the United Kingdom sorted by county. Names are derived from Ordnance Survey 1:63,360, 1:50,000 and 1:25,000 scale maps of Scotland, England, and Wales.

England
From the Scottish border in the vicinity of Berwick-upon-Tweed clockwise around the English coast to the Welsh border at Chepstow:

Northumberland
 Hud's Head
 Cheese sniper
 Lowmoor Point
 Tealhole Point
 Guile Point*
Ross Point
Kiln Point
Budle Point
Blackrocks Point
Snook or North Sunderland Point*
Red Brae or Dell Point
Newton Point
Castle Point
Cullernose Point
Seaton Point
Pan Point
Wellhaugh Point
Snab Point
Beacon Point
Newbiggin Point
Spital Point
Crag Point
Curry's Point
Brown's Point
Tynemouth North Point
Sharpness Point
Freestone Point

Lindisfarne
Listed clockwise from causeway:
Snook Point
Snipe Pint Dab
Emmanuel Head*
Castle Point*

County Durham
Trow Point
Lizard Point
Souter Point
Nose's Point
Chourdon Point
Hive Point
Beacon Point*
Shippersea Point
Hartlepool Ponjint
Inscar Point

North Riding of Yorkshire
Ness Point or North Cheek*
Old Peak or South Cheek
Blea Wyke Point
Hundale Point
Long Nab
Cromer Point
Scalby Ness
White Nab
Osgodby Point

East Riding of Yorkshire
Filey Brigg*
Flamborough Head*
Spurn Head*
Hawkin's Point

Lincolnshire
 Whitton Ness
 Skitter Ness
 Northcoates Point
 Donna Nook*
 Chapel Point
 Ingoldmells Point
 Gibraltar Point*

Norfolk
 St Edmund's Point
 Gore Point
 Scolt Head
 High Cape
 Blakeney Point*
 Marl Point
 Little Marl Point
 Winterton Ness
 Caister Point

Suffolk
 Lowestoft Ness* (most easterly point of England, Great Britain, UK)
 Benacre Ness
 Thorpe Ness
 Orford Ness*
 Landguard Point
 Fagbury Point
 Hall Point
 Collimer Point
 Bloody Point / Shotley Point
 Erwarton Ness
 Stutton Ness

Essex
 Wrabness Point
 Stone Point (west)
Stone Point (east)
The Naze*
Sandy Point
Chevaux de frise Point
Colne Point
Sandy Point
St Osyth Stone Point
Westmarsh Point
Aldboro Point
Shinglehead Point
Mill Point
Decoy Point
 Hilly Pool Point (Northey Island)
Mundon Stone Point
Sales Point
Tip Head
Holliwell Point
Landsend Point
Black Point
Gardenness Point
(multiple points on south shore of Crouch estuary)
Wallasea Ness
Blackedge Point
Barling Ness
Potton Point
Smallgains Point
Nase Point
Foulness Point
(multiple points on shore of Foulness)
Haven Point
Shoebury Ness*
Canvey Point
Leighbeck Point
Deadman's Point
Shellhaven Point
Holehaven Point
Coalhouse Point
Tilbury Ness
Stone Ness

Greater London
Coldharbour Point
Barking or False Point
Margaret or Tripcock Ness
Cross Ness
Jenningtree Point
Crayford Ness

Kent
Broadness
Lower Hope Point
West Point
Foreness Point
White Ness
North Foreland*
Shell Ness
Hope Point
South Foreland*
Copt Point
Dungeness*

Isle of Sheppey
Listed clockwise from Kingsferry Bridge:
Garrison Point
Barton's Point
Warden Point
Shell Ness
Spitend Point

East Sussex
Langney Point
Beachy Head*

West Sussex
Selsey Bill*
East Head
Cobnor Point
Longmere Point
Marker Point

Hampshire
Gilkicker Point
Browndown Point
Calshot Spit
Stone Point
Needs Ore Point
Hurst Castle Spit

Hayling Island
Black Point
Eastoke Point

Isle of Wight
Listed clockwise from East Cowes
Old Castle Point
Puckpool Point
Nettlestone Point
Horestone Point
Node's Point
Bembridge Point
Foreland
Dunnose
Woody Point
Binnel Point
St. Catherine's Point*
Atherfield Point
Hanover Point
New Ditch Point
The Needles*
Hatherwood Point
Warden Point
Sconce Point
Hamstead Point
Egypt Point

Dorset
Hengistbury Head*
North Haven Point
South Haven Point
The Foreland or Handfast Point*
Ballard Point
Peveril Point*
Durlston Head*
Anvil Point
St Aldhelm's Point or St Alban's Head
Egmont Point
Worbarrow Tout
Bat's Head
White Nothe
Redcliff Point
Portland Bill or Bill of Portland*
Golden Cap

South Devon
Beer Head
Straight Point
Orcombe Point
Hope's Nose
Berry Head
Sharkham Point
Scabbacombe Head
Start Point
Prawle Point
Gammon Head
Bolt Head
Bolt Tail
Beacon Point
Stoke Point
Gara Point
Wembury Point

Cornwall
Penlee Point
Rame Head
Gribbin Head
Dodman Point
Nare Head
Zone Point
Pendennis Point
Rosemullion Head
Manacle Point
Lizard Point
Land's End
Cape Cornwall
Zennor Head
St Ives Head
Godrevy Point
St Agnes Head
Ligger Point
Penhale Point
Kelsey Head
Towan Head
Trevose Head
Pentire Point
Tintagel Head
Cambeak
Pencarrow Point
Lower Sharpnose Point
Higher Sharpnose Point

North Devon
Hartland Point
Baggy Point
Morte Point
Bull Point
Foreland Point

Somerset
Hurlstone Point
Brean Down
Worlebury Hill
Sand Point

Gloucestershire
Beachley

Wales
From the English border at Chepstow clockwise around the Welsh coast to the English border near Chester:

Monmouthshire
 Red Cliff
 Black Rock
 Sudbrook Point
 Gold Cliff

Flat Holm (Cardiff)
From ferry landing clockwise around coast:
 Jackdaw Point
 Lighthouse Point
 Bottlewell Point
 North West Point
 Castle Point

Glamorganshire
 Penarth Head*
 Lavernock Point*
 East Point (Sully Island)
 West Point (Sully Island)
 Hayes Point
 Nell's Point
 Friar's Point
 Storehouse Point 
 Cold Knap Point
 Rhoose Point* (competing with Breaksea Point for most southerly point of mainland Wales)
 Watch House Point
 Breaksea Point (competing with Rhoose Point for most southerly point of mainland Wales)
 Summerhouse Point
 Stout Point
 Pigeon Point
 Col-huw Point
 St Donat's Point
 Nash Point*
 Trwyn y Witch*
 Trwyn y March
 Newton Point
 Rhych Point
 Porthcawl Point
 Irongate Point
 Hutchwns Point
 Sker Point
 Witford Point

Gower
 Mumbles Head*
 Rams Tor
 Snaple Point
 Whiteshell Point
 Pwlldu Point
 Pwlldu Head
 Great Tor
 Little Tor
 Oxwich Point
 Port-Eynon Point
 Tears Point
 Worms Head*
 Minor Point
 Foxhole Point
 Twlc Point
 Whiteford Point
 Salthouse Point
 Dalton's Point

Carmarthenshire
 Tywyn Point 
 Ferry Point 
 Wharley Point 
 Ginst Point 
 Gilman Point 
 Ragwen Point 
 Telpyn Point

Pembrokeshire

South coast
From the Carmarthenshire border west to the Angle peninsula:
 Coppet Hall Point 
 Monkstone Point 
 Bowman's Point 
 Second Point 
 First Point 
 Giltar Point 
 Valleyfield Top 
 Proud Giltar 
 Lydstep Point* 
 Old Castle Head 
 Priest's Nose 
 East Moor Cliff 
 West Moor Cliff 
 Trewent Point 
 Greenala Point 
 Stackpole Head 
 Saddle Point 
 Long Matthew Point 
 St Govan's Head*
 Saddle Head 
 Mewsford Point 
 Moody Nose
 Linney Head*
 Great Furzenip
 Little Furzenip
 Sheepland 
 Ratland 
 Thornland

Caldey Island
From ferry landing clockwise around coast:
 Den Point 
 Caldey Point 
 Small Ord Point 
 Chapel Point 
 West Beacon Point 
 Eel Point

Milford Haven coast
From the Angle peninsula to the Dale peninsula:
 Angle Point 
 Sawdern Point 
 Popton Point 
 Pennar Point 
 Hobbs Point 
 Cosheston Point 
 Barnlake Point 
 Wear Point 
 Hakin Point
 South Hook Point 
 Little Castle Head 
 Chester Point 
 Great Castle Head 
 Rook's Nest Point 
 Longberry Point 
 Watch House Point 
 Musselwick Point 
 Dale Point 
 Watwick Point 
 West Blockhouse Point

West coast
From St Ann's Head around Marloes peninsula and St Bride's Bay to St David's Head:
 St Ann's Head* 
 Little Castle Point 
 Short Point 
 Long Point 
 Iron Point 
 Great Castle Head 
 Hooper's Point 
 Pitting Gales Point
 Wooltack Point*
 Haven Point
 High Point
 Tower Point
 The Nab Head
 Castle Head
 Ticklas Point
 Borough Head
 The Point
 Black Point
 Rickets Head
 Maidenhall Point
 Sibbernock Point
 Dinas Fach
 Pen Dinas
 Penrhyn
 Carreg y Barcud
 Penpleidia
 Pen y Cyfrwy
 Trwyn Cynddeiriog
 Pen Pedol
 Pen Dal-aderyn
 Penmaen melyn 
 Penrhyn Dalar
 Point St John
 Trwynhwrddyn
 Penlledwen

Skokholm Island
From ferry landing clockwise around coast:
 Frank's Point
 Quarry Point
 Long Nose
 Little Bay Point
 Long Point

Skomer Island
From ferry landing clockwise around coast:
 Skomer Point

Ramsey Island coast
From ferry landing clockwise around coast:
 Penrhyn Twll
 Trwynmynachdy
 Trwyn yr Allt
 Trwyn Bendro
 Trwynllundain
 Trwyn-drain-du
 Trwyn-Siôn-Owen
 Trwyn Ogof Hen

North coast
From St David's Head east to the Ceredigion border:
 St David's Head*
 Trwyn-llwyd
 Penllechwen
 Trwyn Porth-coch
 Penrhyn Halen
 Penrhyn Ffynnon-las
 Trwyn Dduallt
 Penclegyr
 Ynys Gwair
 Trwyn Aber-pwll
 Trwyncastell
 Pen Porth Egr
 Penclegyr
 Trwyn Elen
 Trwyn Llwyd
 Pen Castell-coch
 Trwyn Llwynog
 Penmorfa
 Pen Deudraeth
 Carreg Golchfa
 Llech Dafad
 Trwyn Llwyd
 Penbwchdy
 Dinas Mawr
 Penrhyn By
 Pen Brush
 Strumble Head/Pen-Caer*
 Trwyn Llwyd
 Pen Capel Degan
 Pen Globa
 Trwyn Llwyd
 Carregwastad Point*
 Penfathach
 Y Penrhyn
 Penanglas
 Crincoed Point
 Pen-cw
 Saddle Point
 Castle Point
 Penrhyn Ychen
 Penrhyn Mawr
 Pen Castell
 Pen Sidan
 Dinas Head*
 Trwyn Isaac
 Penrhyn y Fforest
 Pen-y-bâl
 Pen Cafnau
 Trwyn y Bwa
 Slipping
 Carreg Wylan
 Pen yr Afr
 Carreg Lion
 Cemaes Head*
 Trwyn yr Olchfa
 Trwyn Careg-ddu
 Cafnau Pen Sidan
 Penrhyn Erw-goch

Ceredigion
 Pen yr Ergyd
 Craig y Gwbert 
 Pen Tew
 Pen yr Hwbyn
 Pencestyll 
 Pen-Peles 
 Pencribach
 Pen Traeth-bâch 
 Pen-rhip
 Trwyn Crou
 New Quay Head 
 Pen-y-Gloyn
 Trwyn Pellaf

Gwynedd

Cardigan Bay coast
 Penrhyn Cregyn
 Harlech Point
 Trwynypenrhyn
 Ynys Cyngar
 Penychain
 Carreg y Defaid
 Trwyn Llanbedrog
 Penbennar
 Penrhyn Du
 Trwyn yr Wylfa
 Trwyn Llech-y-doll
 Trwyn Cilan
 Trwyn y Fulfran
 Trwyn Carreg-y-tir
 Trwyn y Ffosle
 Trwyn Talfarach
 Trwyn y Penrhyn
 Pen y Cil
 Trwyn Bychestyn
 Trwyn y Gwyddel
 Trwyn Maen Melyn

North coast
 Braich y Pwll
 Braich y Noddfa
 Braich Anelog
 Dinas Bach
 Trwyn Glas
 Dinas
 Trwyn Garreg-lwyd
 Penrhyn Mawr
 Penrhyn Colmon
 Penrhyn Melyn
 Penrhyn Cwmistir
 Trwyn Porth Dinllaen
 Penrhyn Nefyn
 Penrhyn Bodeilas
 Penrhyn Glas
 Trwyn y Gorlech
 Trwyn y Tâl
 Trwyn Maen Dylan
 Fort Belan Point

Anglesey
Listed clockwise from Menai Bridge.

West coast
 Abermenai Point
 Llanddwyn Island
 Pen-y-parc
 Trwyn y Wylan
 Trwyn Ifan
 Trwyn Tyllog
 Trwyn Euphrates
 Braich Parlwr
 Penrhyn-hwlad
 Trwyn Guter-fudr
 Trwyn y Crewyn
 Trwyn Cerrigyreryr

Holy Island
Clockwise from Four Mile Bridge:
 Rhoscolyn Head
 Ravens Point
 Penrhyn Mawr

North coast
 Carmel Head* (Trwyn y Gader)
 Trwyn Cemlyn
 Trwyn Pencarreg
 Trwyn y Galen-ddu
 Wylfa Head
 Trywn y Penrhyn
 Trwyn y Parc
 Llanbadrig Point
 Llanlleiana Head
 Torllwyn
 Trwyn Llech
 Trwynbychan
 Trwyn Myn
 Trwyn Costog
 Trwyn Penwaig
 Point Lynas* (Trwyn Eilian)

East coast
 Trwyn Du
 Penrhyn Glas
 Trwyn Cwmrwd
 Trwyn Porth-y-môr
 Trwyn Gribin
 Trwyn Grupyl
 Trwyn Melyn
 Penrhyn y Gell
 Penrhyn
 Trwyn Dwlban
 Trwyn Dinmor
 Trwyn Penmon
 Trwyn y Penrhyn
 Gallows Point

Conwy
 Penmaenmawr
 Penamen-bach Point
 Trwyn y Gogarth
 Great Orme's Head*
 Pen-trwyn
 Little Ormes Head
 Trwyn y Fuwch
 Rhos Point

Flintshire
 Point of Ayr*

Northwest England

Cheshire
 Hilbre Point
 Perch Rock

Lancashire
Rossall Point
Sunderland Point
Red Nab
Scalestones Point

Cumbria
Blackstone Point
Holme Island
Blawith Point
Humphrey Head Point
Cowpren Point
Lenibrick Point
Park Head
Hazelhurst Point
Mearness Point
Legbarrow Point
Nab Point
Ashes Point
Hammerside Point
Maskel Point
Westfield Point
Lowsy Point
Hodbarrow Point
Haverigg Point
Drigg Point
St Bees Head
Redness Point
Cunning Point

Scotland

Dumfries-shire
Redkirk Point
Torduff Point
Barnkirk Point
Scar Point

Kirkcudbrightshire
Airds Point
Hogus Point
Borron Point
Southerness Point
Craigneuk Point
Castlehill Point
Isle Point
Almorness Point
Girvellan Point
Torr Point
Balcary Point
Airds Point
Castle Muir Point
Abbey Head
Netherlaw Point
Gipsy Point
Torrs Point
Point of the Isle
Castledykes Point
Gibbhill Point
Bar Point
Manor Point
Mull Point
Dunrod Point
Point of Green
Borness Point
Ringdoo Point
Meggerland Point
Corseyard Point
Point of the Bar
Carrick Point
Craigmore Point
Rough Point (south)
Rough Point (north)
Ringdoo Point
Ravenshall Point

Wigtownshire
Innerwell Point
Port McGean Point
Castle Head
Eggerness Point
Dumbie Point
Sliddery Point
Cruggleton Point
Palmallet Point
Shaddock Point
Cairn Head
Steinhead Point
Stein Head
Isle Head
Broom Point
Burrow Head
Point of Cairndoon
Point of Lag
Barsalloch Point
Saltpan Point
Clone Point
Barr Point
Milton Point
Slackmore Point
Kilfillan Point
Ringdoo Point
Purdie's Point
Blagowan Point
Myroch Point
Terally Point
Grennan Point
Cailiness Point
Mull of Galloway
Carrickcarlin Point
Lythe Head

Ayrshire
Bennane Head

Argyllshire
Mainland:
Mull of Kintyre
Islay
The Oa

Inverness-shire
Isle of Harris:
Eilean Glas, Scalpay
North Uist:
Weavers Point
Aird an Rùnair
South Uist:
Ushenish
Barra Isles
Barra Head
Isle of Skye:
Neist Point
Waternish

Ross and Cromarty
Mainland West Coast:
Corrachadh Mòr
Ardnamurchan Point
Redpoint
Rua Reidh Lighthouse

Isle of Lewis:
Butt of Lewis
Tiumpan Head

Sutherland
Stoer Head
Cape Wrath
Faraid Head

Caithness
Dunnet Head
Holborn Head
Duncansby Head

Ross and Cromarty
Mainland East Coast:
Tarbat Ness

Aberdeenshire
Kinnaird Head
Rattray Head
Keith Inch
Peterhead
Hackley Head
Hare Ness
Downie Point
Bowdun Head
Dunnottar Castle
Milton Ness

Fife
Fife Ness

Berwickshire
Siccar Point
St Abb's Head

Orkney
Westray:
Rapness
South Ronaldsay:
Grim Ness
Orkney Mainland
Point of Hellia
Point of Ayre, Orkney

Shetland
Unst:
Hermaness
Shetland Mainland:
Esha Ness
Sumburgh Head

Northern Ireland

County Londonderry
 Culmore Point
 Magilligan Point*
 Portstewart Point
 Rinagree Point

County Antrim
 Ramore Head
 Runkerry Point
 Giants Causeway*
 Benbane Head*
 Bengore Head
 Contham Head
 Geeraagh Point
 Gid Point
 Larry Bane Head
 Kinbane or White Head
 Benmore or Fair Head* (northernmost point of Northern Ireland)
 Drumnakill Point
 Ruebane Point
 Torr Head
 Crockan Point
 Runabay Head
 Tornamoney Point
 Limerick Point
 Garron Point*
 Hunter's Point
 Straidkilly Point
 Park Head
 Whitebay Point
 Ballygalley Head
 Curran Point
 Dalaradia Point
 Barney's Point
 Ferris Point
 Barr's Point
 Skernaghan Point
 Black Head
 White Head
 Cloghan Point
 Macedon Point

County Down
 Grey Point
 Swineley Point
 Wilsons Point
 Lukes Point
 Ballymacormick Point
 Sheep Point
 Orlock Point
 Rogers Point
 Foreland Point
 Dormans Point
 Robbys Point
 James Point
 Ballyferis Point
 Burr Point* (easternmost point of mainland of Northern Ireland)
 Ringboy Point 
 Slanes Point 
 Kearney Point 
 Ballyquintin Point 
 Carrstown Point 
 Ringburr Point (in Strangford Lough)
 Kilclief Point
 Mullog Point
 Killard Point
 Cloghan Head
 Phennick Point
 Ringfad Point
 Crane Point
 Curlew Point
 Corbet Head
 St John's Point
 Corely Point
 Rathmullan Point
 Ringsallin Point
 Dunmore Head
 Russells Point
 Murphy's Point
 Danes' Bridge Point
 Ballykeel Point
 Lee Stone Point
 Crawfords Point
 Nicholsons Point
 Cranfield Point* (southernmost point of Northern Ireland)
 Soldiers Point
 Greencastle Point
 Killowen Point
 Dobbin's Point
 Warrenpoint

See also
 List of spits of the United Kingdom
 Coastal landforms of Ireland

United Kingdom geography-related lists